Dominican Republic–Haiti relations refers to the diplomatic relations between the Dominican Republic and the Republic of Haiti. Relations have long been hostile due to the substantial ethnic and cultural differences between the two nations and their sharing of the island of Hispaniola, part of the Greater Antilles archipelago in the Caribbean region. Living standards in the Dominican Republic are considerably higher than those in Haiti. The economy of the Dominican Republic is ten times larger than  that of Haiti.
The migration of impoverished Haitians and deep-set cultural differences have contributed to long-standing conflicts.

Tension arose on the island. This laid the foundation for the tension between the countries that subsequently became present-day Haiti and the Dominican Republic. Historical events led to   Dominicans and Haitians becoming culturally and ethnically different groups; however, both groups are considered to be both Latin American and Caribbean countries. After Haiti established its independence on January 1, 1804, as the First Empire of Haiti, ambitions to control the whole island accumulated amongst many Haitian rulers, which led to a 22-year military occupation of the east (1822–1844) and a series of invasions (1805–1857). Thus since 1804 many wars, border disputes, and stand-offs have occurred between the two countries. Notable events included the Beheadings of Moca in 1805 and the Parsley Massacre in 1937. In the 21st century, illegal Haitian immigration into the Dominican Republic keeps tensions high. Many Haitians migrate due to poverty and unrest in their own country.

Country comparison

History

European colonization
The island of Hispaniola is the site of the first permanent European settlement in the Americas, the Captaincy General of Santo Domingo established in 1493 by Christopher Columbus under Spain. The original inhabitants of the island were the Native Tainos, an indigenous group related to the Amazonian natives of  South America. The native Tainos suffered a population decline early on due to enslavement, warfare, and intermixing with the Spanish colonizers. When the Spanish Crown outlawed the enslavement of Natives in the island with the Laws of Burgos, slaves from West Africa and Central Africa were imported from the 16th to 18th centuries due to labor demands. These Africans eventually intermixed with the Europeans, Mestizos, and Natives creating a triracial Creole culture in Santo Domingo. The official name was La Española, meaning "The Spanish (Island)". It was also called Santo Domingo, after Saint Dominic. 

The Spanish Empire controlled the entire island of Hispaniola from the 1490s until the 17th century, when French pirates began establishing bases on the western side of the island. Struggles began during colonial times and developed into nearly constant conflicts between the two governments. The political division of the island of Hispaniola is due to the European struggle for control of the New World, when France and Spain began fighting for control of the island. They resolved their dispute in 1697 by splitting the island into two colonies. France imported nearly ten times as many slaves, creating a divergent population on their side of the island. It was not until the 19th century that Haiti became independent from France on 1 January 1804. Spanish colony of Santo Domingo, the predecessor of the Dominican Republic, became independent from Spain on 1 December 1821, after more than 300 years of Spanish control.

Failed invasion from Haiti (1805) 

Following the 1804 French massacre in Haiti, which ended in April of that year, Jean-Jacques Dessalines, who later declared himself emperor, learned of a small French garrison stationed in Santo Domingo. French troops, led by Jean-Louis Ferrand, seized black children to be sold into slavery. This action infuriated Dessalines, who decided to invade Santo Domingo at the head of 21,000 soldiers in February 1805. He managed to reach the capital, but was unable to lay siege due to its protection by a large wall. Suddenly, he was notified of a French ship heading towards Haiti, which he believed was sent to attack the country, and immediately called off the siege. Along the way, Dessalines and Henri Christophe raided through the interior towns in the Cibao, while Alexandre Petion raided through Azua. They entered the cities, killing everyone they encountered, setting entire buildings fire, and committed numerous atrocities on the Dominicans. From each city, later set ablaze by the Haitians, prisoners were rounded up by the army and forced to accompany them back to Haiti. The march back to Haiti was nightmarish for the prisoners, who were brutalized and abused at the hands of their captors. Once arrived, the prisoners were either massacred in the streets, or forced to work as slaves on plantations on the orders of Dessalines. This entire ordeal claimed the lives of nearly half of the inhabitants, who ranged from children, men, women, elders, black, mixed, and white.

Ephemeral independence and Haitian occupation (1821–1844)

On 9 November 1821 the Spanish colony of Santo Domingo was overthrown by a group of rebels at the command of José Núñez de Cáceres, the colony's former administrator, as they proclaimed independence from the Spanish crown on 1 December 1821. 

A group of Dominican military officers favored uniting the newly independent nation with Haiti, as they sought political stability under Haitian president Jean-Pierre Boyer. The Dominicans were unaware that Boyer made a concession with the French, and agreed to pay France for the lost territory of Haiti. Boyer agreed to pay a sum of 150 million Francs (nearly twice what France had charged the United States for the much larger Louisiana territory in 1803) thus the Haitians would essentially be forced into paying to maintain their freedom from the French.

During twenty-two years of Haitian occupation, the Haitians implemented what some Dominicans viewed as a brutal military regime. Use of the French language over Spanish was enforced, and the army closed Universidad Santo Tomás de Aquino. In addition, the Haitian army confiscated all church land and property and imposed mandatory military service. This difficult time for the Dominicans created cultural conflicts in language, race, religion and national tradition between the Dominicans and Haitians. Many Dominicans developed a resentment of Haitians, who they saw as oppressors.

In order to raise funds for the huge indemnity of 150 million francs that Haiti agreed to pay the former French colonists, and which was subsequently lowered to 60 million francs, Haiti imposed heavy taxes on the Dominicans. Since Haiti was unable to adequately provision its army, the occupying forces largely survived by commandeering or confiscating food and supplies at gunpoint. Attempts to redistribute land conflicted with the system of communal land tenure (terrenos comuneros), which had arisen with the ranching economy, and newly emancipated slaves resented being forced to grow cash crops under Boyer's Code Rural. In rural areas, the Haitian administration was usually too inefficient to enforce its own laws. It was in the city of Santo Domingo that the effects of the occupation were most acutely felt, and it was there that the movement for independence originated.

Haiti's constitution also forbade non-citizens from owning land. However, it did protect citizens who were recognized for owning land from others who may have tried and taken this land from them. According to their constitution, it was unlawful for one to deny property to a citizen who already owned it. Most emigrated to Cuba, Puerto Rico (these two being Spanish possessions at the time) or Gran Colombia, usually with the encouragement of Haitian officials, who acquired their lands. The Haitians, who associated the Roman Catholic Church with the French slave-masters who had exploited them before independence, confiscated all church property, deported all foreign clergy, and severed the ties of the remaining clergy to the Vatican. Santo Domingo's university, lacking both students and teachers had to close down, and thus the country suffered from a massive case of human capital flight.

Although the occupation effectively eliminated colonial slavery and instated a constitution modeled after the United States Constitution throughout the island, several resolutions and written dispositions were expressly aimed at converting average Dominicans into second-class citizens: restrictions of movement, prohibition to run for public office, night curfews, inability to travel in groups, banning of civilian organizations, and the indefinite closure of the state university (on the alleged grounds of its being a subversive organization) all led to the creation of movements advocating a forceful separation from Haiti with no compromises.

Dominican War of Independence (1844–1856)

On 27 February 1844 the Dominicans, led by Juan Pablo Duarte along with Francisco del Rosario Sánchez and Matías Ramón Mella, gained freedom from Haitian rule, thus giving birth to the Dominican Republic.

After ousting the Haitian occupying force from the country, Dominican nationalists had to fight against a series of attempted invasions from 1844 to 1856. Haitian soldiers would make incessant attacks to try to regain control of the territory, but these efforts were to no avail as the Dominicans would go on to win every battle henceforth. Since then, Dominican–Haitian relations have been unstable.

Parsley Massacre (1937)

In October 1937, claiming that Haiti was harboring his former Dominican opponents, Rafael Trujillo ordered an attack on Haitians living in the border regions of the Dominican Republic, slaughtering tens of thousands of Haitians as they tried to escape. The number of dead is still unknown, though it is now calculated between 20,000 and 30,000.

Contemporary

Cultural and economic factors

In the mid-twentieth century, the economies of the two countries were comparable. Since that time, the Dominican economy has grown while the Haitian economy has diminished. The economic downturn in Haiti has been the result of factors such as internal power struggles, rapid population growth, environmental degradation, and trade embargoes. Today, Haiti is the poorest country in the Western Hemisphere. There is a lack of resources, and Haiti's population density exceeds its neighbor's by far. Despite the  sending missions since the 1990s, in order to maintain peace, terrible conditions persist.

One large contributor to cultural dissonance is the language barrier, as Spanish is the primary language spoken in the eastern part of Hispaniola (Dominican Republic) while French and Haitian Creole are spoken in the western part (Haiti). Race is another defining factor of Dominican–Haitian relations. The ethnic composition of the Dominican population is 73%mixed race, 16%white, and 11%black; while 95% of the Haitian population is black.

The Dominican economy is also over 1000% larger than the Haitian economy. The estimated annual per capita economic output (PPP) is US$1,819 in Haiti and US$20,625 in Dominican Republic.
The divergence between the level of economic development between Haiti and the Dominican Republic makes their border the one with the highest contrast of all Western world borders and it is evident that the Dominican Republic has one of the highest illegal migration issues in the Americas.

Haitian migration in the Dominican Republic

Some cross-border cooperation exists in areas such as health, business, and infrastructure. Many Haitians travel to the Dominican Republic to find seasonal or long-term work in order to send remittances to their families. Some of these Haitian workers, as well as Dominicans of Haitian descent have reported complaints of discrimination against them by the Dominican majority population. Other Haitians who would seek work, instead remain in Haiti, fearing discrimination on the other side of the border.

Migration has been taking place since the 1920s, when Haitian laborers were actively encouraged to come work in the thriving Dominican sugar industry. With modernization from the 1960s on, fewer workers were required, and other Dominican industries and services started employing more Haitian workers, often an inexpensive, less regulated labor source with fewer legal protections. Many Haitian women find work in Dominican households, and Haitian men at Dominican construction sites, often leading to the move of an entire family.

A large number of migrated Haitian workers have continued to live in the Dominican Republic over several generations. The two governments have been unable to agree upon a legal framework to address the nationality of these descendants, leaving around one million people of Haitian ancestry in the Dominican Republic effectively stateless, restricting their access to health care, education and employment opportunities.

Though migration from Haiti to the Dominican Republic is economically beneficial to both countries, it is one of the leading contributors to tension between the two countries as well; illegal immigration from Haiti resonates high dissonance with the Dominican people. It has led to anti-Haitian feelings and mistrust of the Haitian people. Another problem with Haitian migration into Dominican Republic is that it blurs the line of citizenship. This factor of migration affects not only Dominican economy but its culture as well.

Travel across the border is quite easy, with daily bus service from Santo Domingo to both Haiti's north and south coasts.  Much of the frontier remains very open, with regular crossings to markets on either side.  It is possible to drive much of the line and one unfenced north–south highway actually straddles the border.

2010 Haitian earthquake
After the devastating earthquake of 12 January 2010, countless Haitians fled across the border to escape the quake's effects. The Dominican government was one of the first to send teams to help distribute food and medicine to the victims and made it easier for Haitians to acquire visas to receive treatment in Dominican hospitals.  Supplies were transported to Haiti through the Dominican Republic, and many injured Haitians have been treated in Dominican hospitals.

Haitian refugees were also taken in and supported by many Dominicans, though relations deteriorated as the refugees have remained in the Dominican Republic. This has led to reported concerns among some Dominicans that quake refugees contribute to rising crime, over-crowding, cholera and unemployment. More and more discrimination has been attributed to the massive numbers of Haitian refugees in the Dominican Republic. Over the past years tensions have risen, causing the International Organization for Migration to offer Haitians $50 each plus additional relocation assistance to return to Haiti. More than 1,500 have accepted that assistance and returned.

Sports
In 2016, the baseball federations of the Dominican Republic and Haiti agreed to develop and promote baseball in Haiti (especially at the border), on the basis that sport is a developmental element to foster peace, as well as strengthening friendship and mutual respect between the two peoples. With the support of the Dominican ministry of Sports, the president of the Dominican Baseball Federation (FEDOBE) was thankful and quoted saying "it allows our federation to fulfill the dream of helping Haiti in baseball." He has pledged to put the Haitian Baseball Federation in relation to the international organizations. Coaches will be sent to Haiti for technical courses, referees and scorers by the Dominican Baseball Federation, while the Haitian Federation will support the logistics in the training and training programs.

Resident diplomatic missions
 Dominican Republic has an embassy in Port-au-Prince and consulates-general in Anse-à-Pitres and Ouanaminthe and a consulate in Belladère.
 Haiti has an embassy in Santo Domingo and consulates-general in Dajabón, Higüey, Santa Cruz de Barhona and Santiago de los Caballeros.

See also
 Dominican Republic–Haiti border

Footnotes

 
Haiti
Bilateral relations of Haiti